Nikhil Rajendrakumar Rathod (born 3 September 1984) is an Indian cricketer. He is a right-handed legbreak bowler and was a member of the Indian U-19 cricket team at the 2004 ICC Under-19 Cricket World Cup. he's also in cricket administration as CEO of franchises in Various ICC,BCCI approved leagues.

References
https://www.cricketnmore.com/cricket-news/saurashtra-cricket-body-in-conflict-of-interest-mess-68943https://indianexpress.com/article/sports/cricket/ex-player-takes-saurashtra-state-unit-to-court-for-nepotism-diverting-funds-6232394/https://www.rediff.com/cricket/2004/feb/09colts.htm

External links

1984 births
Living people
Indian cricketers
Saurashtra cricketers
People from Rajkot